The Royal Asiatic Society of Sri Lanka (Ceylon before 1972) has published a journal since 1845.

References

Multidisciplinary academic journals